Kordiimonas gwangyangensis (strain GW14-5T) is a marine bacterium that can degrade a number of polycyclic hydrocarbons. It was first found in Gwangyang Bay.

References

External links
Type strain of Kordiimonas gwangyangensis at BacDive -  the Bacterial Diversity Metadatabase

Hydrocarbon-degrading bacteria